Mpur is an unclassified and unattested language once spoken in the village of Tuluwe at the confluence of the Black and White Voltas, and in Kusawgu Division. It is near the poorly attested language Mpra spoken in the nearby village of Butie, which may turn out to be a language isolate, though the Mpra people come from further west.

References

Languages of Ghana
Unclassified languages of Africa
Languages extinct in the 1960s